Hodder & Stoughton is a British publishing house, now an imprint of Hachette.

History

Early history 

The firm has its origins in the 1840s, with Matthew Hodder's employment, aged 14, with Messrs Jackson and Walford, the official publisher for the Congregational Union. In 1861 the firm became Jackson, Walford and Hodder; but in 1868 Jackson and Walford retired, and Thomas Wilberforce Stoughton joined the firm, creating Hodder & Stoughton.

Hodder & Stoughton published both religious and secular works, and its religious list contained some progressive titles. These included George Adam Smith's Isaiah for its Expositor’s Bible series, which was one of the earliest texts to identify multiple authorship in the Book of Isaiah. There was also a sympathetic Life of St Francis by Paul Sabatier, a French Protestant pastor. Matthew Hodder made frequent visits to North America, meeting with the Moody Press and making links with Scribners and Fleming H. Revell.

The secular list only gradually accepted fiction, and it was still subject to "moral censorship" in the early part of the 20th century. Matthew Hodder was doubtful about the Rubaiyat of Omar Khayyam, and the company refused Michael Arlen's The Green Hat, a novel published by Collins in 1924. In 1922, Hodder and Stoughton published an edition of Lewis Carroll's Alice's Adventures in Wonderland, which was likely very controversial at the time given the fantastical nature of the work.

The 1920s brought an explosion of commercial fiction at keen prices - Hodder's "Yellow jackets" series were the precursors of the first paperbacks, and included bestsellers from John Buchan, Edgar Wallace, Dornford Yates and Sapper's Bulldog Drummond. In 1928, the company became the exclusive British hardback publisher of Leslie Charteris's adventure novel series, The Saint, publishing all 50 UK first editions of the series until 1983. In this decade they also took over ownership of the medical journal, The Lancet.

Hodder & Stoughton were also the originators of the Teach Yourself line of self-instruction books, which are still published through Hodder Headline's educational division. As the company expanded at home and overseas, Hodder & Stoughton's list swelled to include the real-life adventures in Peary's North Pole and several works by Winston Churchill.

During the war, Ralph Hodder Williams set up the Brockhampton Book Co. to sell off overstocks of theological works. The manager, Ernest Roker, had an interest in children's books and managed to persuade author Enid Blyton to write a series of books for them about four children and a dog. In 1942, the Famous Five series was born with Five on a Treasure Island. In 1962, Brockhampton took over the children's writer Elinor Lyon, whose novels the parent company had introduced in 1948.

Hodder & Stoughton also published the Biggles books by Captain W. E. Johns, after he moved publishers from the Oxford University Press during the Second World War.  Hodder & Stoughton published their first original Biggles book in 1942 with Biggles Sweeps the Desert around September/October of that year (they had previously published a reprint of Biggles Flies East in May 1942) and the Brockhampton Press published Johns' Gimlet books from 1947.  From 1953, Brockhampton Press would also publish Biggles books, alternating with Hodder & Stoughton and Captain W. E. Johns remained with them until his death in 1968, with the last Hodder & Stoughton Biggles book appearing in August 1965 and the last Brockhampton Press Biggles book appearing in July 1970.  Hodder & Stoughton also published some of Johns' Worrals books.  Hodder & Stoughton eventually published 35 Biggles first editions and Brockhampton Press published a further 29 Biggles first editions.

Post-war years 

In 1953 they published Sir John Hunt's successful The Ascent of Everest, and began their long association with thriller writer John Creasey. In the 1970s, they brought the Knight and Coronet imprints into common use. The latter is particularly memorable for David Niven's much-celebrated autobiography The Moon's a Balloon.

In the 1960s the Hodder and Stoughton fiction list broadened to include many quality commercial authors, including Mary Stewart whose works included Madam, Will You Talk? and sold millions of copies worldwide. The non-fiction publishing included Anthony Sampson's era-defining The Anatomy of Britain in 1962. Another notable title in the children's sphere was the 1969 Brockhampton Press publication of Asterix the Gaul by Goscinny and Uderzo.

In 1974, John le Carré’s Tinker, Tailor, Soldier, Spy was published to much critical acclaim, earning him a Literary Guild Choice. The following year, previous employee John Attenborough published A Living Memory of Hodder. In 1981, the company acquired the New English Library, an imprint created by the American Times Mirror Company that published works from several genres including fantasy, science fiction and suspense and included books by James Herbert and Stephen King.

In 1986, Hodder & Stoughton introduced Sceptre as a literary imprint to sit alongside mass-market imprints Coronet and NEL. Originally publishing in paperback only, early books on the Sceptre list included Thomas Keneally’s Schindler's Ark which had won the Booker Prize in 1982. Hodder & Stoughton also won the Booker Prize in 1985 with the publication of Keri Hulme’s The Bone People, originally acquired from its New Zealand office.

Other notable books on the Hodder & Stoughton list in this decade include Rosamunde Pilcher’s The Shell Seekers, Elizabeth George’s A Great Deliverance and the first novel in Jean M. Auel’s prehistoric fiction series Earth’s Children® The Clan of the Cave Bear, which was an international success and the series, completed with the publication of The Land of Painted Caves in 2011, has sold more than 45 million copies worldwide.

The Lancet was sold to Elsevier in 1991. In 1993, Headline bought Hodder & Stoughton and the company became a division of Hodder Headline Ltd. In 1997 Sceptre published Charles Frazier’s Cold Mountain and the following year Hodder & Stoughton released Sir Alex Ferguson’s much-lauded autobiography Managing My Life.

In 1999, Hodder Headline was acquired by W H Smith. Also in 1999, Hodder acquired the children's publisher Wayland Publishers from Wolters Kluwer.

21st century 

In 2002 Hodder Headline Ltd acquired John Murray and two years later Hodder Headline was bought by Hachette Livre, which already owned British publishers Orion and Octopus. When Hachette also acquired Time Warner Book Group (now Little, Brown) it became the UK’s lead publisher. The Hodder & Stoughton fiction list is now home to John Connolly, Jeffery Deaver, John Grisham, Sophie Hannah, Stephen King, Jodi Picoult, Peter Robinson and Robyn Young. The 2009 publication of David Nicholls’ One Day heralded another international success. David wrote the screenplay for the 2011 film adaptation, directed by Lone Scherfig and the book has sold more than two million copies worldwide.

On 7 July 2010 they released Stephen King's Under the Dome with four cover versions.

In 2011, Jeffery Deaver continued the James Bond literary franchise with his 007 novel Carte Blanche.

In 2014, Hodder acquired the independent publisher Quercus.

Non-fiction and imprints 

The non-fiction list covers many areas including biography, memoir, sport, humour, health, cookery and lifestyle. Notable publications of recent years include James Bowen's A Street Cat named Bob" & its Second Book "the World According to Bob" and its Third Book in the works, Michael Parkinson’s Parky, Michael Caine’s The Elephant to Hollywood, Peter Kay's The Book That’s More Than Just a Book-Book and Lady Gaga’s first official book Gaga in 2011.

Sceptre continues to add to its literary heritage, publishing authors such as Melvyn Bragg, Chris Cleave, author of The Other Hand, Jill Dawson, Siri Hustvedt, Thomas Keneally, Andrew Miller and David Mitchell. In 2010 Hodder & Stoughton launched the lifestyle imprint Saltyard and brought Coronet back into use. 
In 2011, Hodder and Stoughton launched the imprints Two Roads Books and Mulholland Books.

Hodder Faith is the UK's leading Christian publisher, home to authors Philip Yancey, Joyce Meyer and R. T. Kendall, among others. They continue to publish the NIV Bible in its various formats and to break new ground with books like Wm. Paul Young’s The Shack (2008).

Flipback 

In 2011, Hodder launched a wholly new print format for books, the flipback. Printed on Bible paper, and designed to replicate the traditional print reading experience in an edition not much bigger than an iPhone.

Imprints 

 Coronet Books
 Hodder Faith
 Hodder Moa Beckett (New Zealand)
 Hodder & Stoughton
 John Murray
 Mulholland
 Quercus
 Sceptre
 Saltyard
 Two Roads
 Yellow Kite

Notable publications

See also

 List of largest UK book publishers

References

Further reading 
Attenborough, John (1975) A Living Memory: Hodder and Stoughton 1868-1975, London: Hodder and Stoughton
 Bennett, Bryan & Hamilton, Anthony (1990) Edward Arnold: 100 Years of Publishing. Illustrated with black and white plates, including a frontispiece of Edward Arnold London: Edward Arnold (A Division of Hodder & Stoughton)

External links 

 
 Flipback Books
 Hodder & Stoughton Limited at London Metropolitan Archives
Finding aid to the Hodder and Stoughton records at Columbia University. Rare Book & Manuscript Library.

Book publishing companies of the United Kingdom
Christian publishing companies
Book publishing company imprints
Publishing companies established in 1868
1868 establishments in England